Lieutenant-General Sir Sydney John Cotton  (2 December 1792 – 19 February 1874) was a British Army officer. He was the commandment of the Moreton Bay penal colony in Australia.

Military career
Born the second son of Henry Calveley Cotton of Woodcote, Oxfordshire, England, and his wife Matilda, daughter and heiress of John Lockwood of Dews Hall, Essex, Cotton joined the British Army in 1810 as a Cornet in the 22nd Light Dragoons.

He served in India from 1810 to 1835.

He served extensively in Australia (1835 to 1842) including being the commandant of the Moreton Bay penal colony (now the city of Brisbane) from 1837 to 1839.

He returned to India for further service 1842 to 1863, including service throughout the Indian Mutiny of 1857–58.

For his frontier services, Cotton was appointed KCB and after returning to England he became General Officer Commanding Northern District in July 1865. He was promoted to lieutenant-General in 1866 and, after publishing "Nine Years on the North-West Frontier of India from 1854 to 1863" in 1868, he was advanced to GCB in 1872.

He was Governor of the Royal Hospital Chelsea from 1872 until 1874.

He is buried in Brompton Cemetery, London.

Mount Cotton, Queensland is named after him.

See also
 Rev. Richard Lynch Cotton (1794–1880), younger brother
 Sir Arthur Thomas Cotton (1803–1899), younger brother

References

External links
Australian Dictionary of Biography

 

|-

 

1792 births
1874 deaths
Knights Grand Cross of the Order of the Bath
Burials at Brompton Cemetery
British Army lieutenant generals
British non-fiction writers
British military personnel of the Indian Rebellion of 1857
41st Regiment of Foot officers
28th Regiment of Foot officers
19th-century English people
British male writers
Sydney
Moreton Bay penal settlement
Male non-fiction writers